C/AL (Client/server Application Language) was the programming language used within C/SIDE the Client/Server Integrated Development Environment in Microsoft Dynamics NAV (Formerly known as Navision Attain) and Microsoft Dynamics 365 Business Central up until (and including) version 14.  It has been replaced by AL. C/AL is a Database specific programming language, and is primarily used for retrieving, inserting and modifying records in a Navision database. C/AL resembles the Pascal language on which it is based. The original C/AL compiler was written by Michael Nielsen.

Examples

Hello World 
This is the classic Hello World example. Since the C/SIDE (Client/Server Integrated Development Environment) does not have a console to output text, this example is made using a dialog box as the visual interface.
  MESSAGE('hello, world!');

Filtering and retrieving record 

Variables in C/AL are not defined through code, but are defined via the variable declaration menu in the C/AL editor. In this example  Item is assumed to be a variable of type Record.
  IF Item.GET('31260210') THEN
    MESSAGE(STRSUBSTNO('Item name is: %1',Item.Description));

  Item.RESET;
  Item.SETRANGE("No.",FromItem,ToItem);
  Item.FINDLAST;
.

Looping and data manipulation

Looping over a recordset and modifying the individual records is achieved with only a few lines of code.

  Item.RESET;
  Item.SETRANGE("Blocked",TRUE);
  IF Item.FINDSET THEN
    REPEAT
      IF Item."Profit %" < 20 THEN BEGIN
        Item."Profit %" := 20;
        Item.MODIFY(TRUE);
      END;
    UNTIL Item.NEXT = 0;
  Item.MODIFYALL("Blocked",FALSE);

See also
Microsoft Dynamics NAV

References

External links
Microsoft Dynamics NAV Official Site

Pascal programming language family
Query languages
Microsoft Dynamics
Microsoft programming languages